The Makati–Mandaluyong Bridge is a four-lane road bridge crossing the Pasig River in Metro Manila, the Philippines. It connects P. Burgos Extension, a continuation of Makati Avenue in Barangay Poblacion, Makati at the south bank of the river to Coronado Street in Barangay Hulo, Mandaluyong at the north bank. The bridge was opened in 1986.

The Hulo jeepney terminal, which serves intra-city jeepney and tricycle routes in Mandaluyong, was established in 2015 and can be found under and adjacent to the bridge. Until the opening of the Estrella–Pantaleon Bridge in 2011, the Makati–Mandaluyong Bridge was the only bridge connecting the two cities other than the Guadalupe Bridge that carries EDSA.

Gallery

References

Bridges in Metro Manila
Bridges completed in 1986
Buildings and structures in Makati
Buildings and structures in Mandaluyong